Regional 2 South East, previously known as London 1 South, is an English level 6 rugby union regional league for rugby clubs in London and the south-east of England including sides from East Sussex, south Essex, south Greater London, Hampshire, Kent, Surrey and West Sussex. When this division began in 1987 it was known as London 2 South, changing to London 1 South ahead of the 2009–10 season.

It was the feeder league for London & South East Premier into which the champion team each season is promoted. The second-placed team entered a play-off against the runner-up of London 1 North. Three teams were relegated into a mixture of London 2 South East and London 2 South West.

Structure and format
The fourteen teams play home and away matches from September through to April, making a total of twenty-six matches each. The results of the matches contribute points to the league as follows:
    4 points are awarded for a win
    2 points are awarded for a draw
    0 points are awarded for a loss, however
    1 losing (bonus) point is awarded to a team that loses a match by 7 points or fewer
    1 additional (bonus) point is awarded to a team scoring 4 tries or more in a match

There is one automatic promotion place, one play-off place for promotion and (usually) three relegation places. The first-placed team at the end of season wins promotion to London & South East Premier while the runner-up plays the second-placed team from London 1 North, with the winner also being promoted. The last three placed clubs are usually relegated to either London 2 South East or London 2 South West depending on location.

Teams 2022–23

Departing were London Welsh and Camberley who were promoted to Regional 1 South Central and Medway, promoted to Regional 1 South East. Also leaving the league were Hammersmith & Fulham, London Cornish, Cobham and London Irish Wild Geese - all level transferred to Regional 2 Thames.

Teams 2021–22

The teams competing in 2021-22 achieved their places in the league based on performances in 2019–20, the 'previous season' column in the table below refers to that season not 2020–21. 

Ahead of the new season Haywards Heath (promoted as London 2 SE champions in 2019–20) withdrew from the league meaning London 1 South will run with 13 teams in 2021–22.

Season 2020–21

On 30 October 2020 the RFU announced  that due to the coronavirus pandemic a decision had been taken to cancel Adult Competitive Leagues (National League 1 and below) for the 2020/21 season meaning London 1 South was not contested.

Teams 2019–20

Teams 2018–19

Teams 2017–18

Teams 2016–17

Sutton & Epsom,  the current champions were promoted to National 3 London & South East for the 2016–17 season, while the second-placed team, Guildford beat Tring, the runner-up from London 1 North, in a play-off for the second promotion place. Twickenham and Charlton Park are relegated. Medway were also relegated despite finishing third due to an RFU punishment for incorrect registration of, and illegal payments to, players thus granting a reprieve from relegation for Gosport and Fareham.

Medway RFC were replaced by Gravesend who were relegated from National 3 London & SE. Promoted into the league were winners of London 2 South East, Tunbridge Wells as well as Cobham as champions of London 2 South West and play-off winners Sevenoaks. CS Rugby 1863 were transferred from London 1 North because they were the most southern team in London 1 North due of an imbalance in North and South teams in the leagues.

2015–16

Final league table

Promotion play-off
Each season, the runners-up in London 1 South and London 1 North participate in a play-off for promotion to National 3 London & SE. The team with the best playing record, in this case Tring, from London 1 North, was the home team and the away team Guildford, won the match 26 – 21, with a try in the 79th minute.

2014–15

Basingstoke (relegated from National League 3 London & SE)
Brighton
Charlton Park (promoted from London 2 South East)
Chobham 
Cobham
Dover
Gosport & Fareham (promoted from London 2 South West)
Guildford
Havant
Hove
Sidcup
Sutton & Epsom
Twickenham (promoted from London 2 North West (play-off winners))
Wimbledon

2013–14

Beckenham
Brighton (promoted from London 2 South East)
Chichester
Chobham (promoted from London 2 South West)
Cobham
Dover
Gravesend
Havant
Haywards Heath
Hove
Sidcup
Staines (relegated from National League 3 London & SE)
Sutton & Epsom RFC (promoted from London 2 South West)
Wimbledon RFC

2012–13

Basingstoke
Beckenham
Chichester
Cobham
Dover
East Grinstead
Gosport & Fareham
Havant (relegated from National League 3 London & SE)
Haywards Heath
Hove
Old Colfeians (transferred from London 1 North)
Trojans
Sidcup
Sutton & Epsom RFC
Wimbledon

2011–12

Basingstoke
Beckenham
Chichester
Cobham
Dover
Guernsey
Haywards Heath
Hove 
Old Elthamians
Portsmouth RFC
Sidcup
Sutton & Epsom RFC
Thanet Wanderers
Trojans RFC

2010–11

Beckenham
Chichester
Cobham
Chobham   
Dover
Haywards Heath
Hove 
London Irish Wild Geese 
Portsmouth RFC
Sutton & Epsom RFC
Thanet Wanderers
Tonbridge Juddians
Tunbridge Wells 
Wimbledon

2009-10

Aylesford Bulls
Beckenham
Chichester
Cobham
Chobham   
Dover
Gravesend 
Maidstone
Old Colfeians
Old Elthamians
Sidcup
Thanet Wanderers
Tunbridge Wells 
Wimbledon

Original teams

When league rugby began in 1987 this division (known as London 2 South) contained the following teams:

Basingstoke
Camberley
Gravesend
KCS Old Boys
Old Alleynians
Old Brockleians
Old Mid-Whitgiftian
Old Reigatian
Portsmouth
Old Juddian
Worthing

London 1 South honours

London 2 South (1987–1993) 

In the first season of the English rugby union league pyramid, sponsored by Courage, there was six, tier six leagues. The initial name was London 2 South and was for teams based in London and the counties of Hampshire, Kent, Surrey and Sussex. There was eleven teams in the league and each team played one match against each of the other teams, giving each team five home matches and five away matches. The winning team was awarded two points, and there was one point for each team in a drawn match.

The original London 2 South was a tier 6 league with promotion up to London 1 and relegation down to either London 3 South East or London 3 South West.

London 2 South (1993–1994)

At the end of the 1992–93 season the top six teams from London Division 1 and the top six from South West Division 1 were combined to create National 5 South.  This meant that London 2 South dropped from a tier 6 league to a tier 7 league for the years that National 5 South was active.  Promotion continued to London 1 and relegation down to either London 3 South East or London 3 South West.

London 2 South (1996–2009)

The cancellation of National 5 South at the end of the 1995–96 season meant that London 2 South reverted to being a tier 6 league.  Promotion continued to London 1 and relegation down to either London 3 South East or London 3 South West (renamed to London 2 South East and London 2 South West from the 2000–01 season onward).

London 1 South

London 2 South was renamed to London 1 South from the 2009–10 season onward.  It continued as a tier 6 league with promotion to National League 3 London & South East (formerly London 1 and currently known as London & South East Premier) and relegation to London 2 South East and London 2 South West (formerly London 3 South East and London 3 South West).

Promotion play-offs
Since the 2000–01 season there has been a play-off between the runners-up of London 1 North and London 1 South for the third and final promotion place to London & South East Premier. The team with the superior league record has home advantage in the tie. At the end of the 2019–20 season the London 1 South teams have been the most successful with eleven wins to the London 1 North teams eight; and the home team has won promotion on thirteen occasions compared to the away teams six.

Number of league titles

Basingstoke (2)
Canterbury (2)
Gravesend (2)
Haywards Heath (2)
Sutton & Epsom (2)
Wimbledon (2)
Camberley (2)
Barnes (1)
Charlton Park (1)
CS Rugby 1863 (1)
Dorking (1)
East Grinstead (1)
Esher (1)
Guernsey (1)
Havant (1)
Old Alleynian (1)
Old Colfeians (1)
Old Mid-Whitgiftian (1)
Portsmouth (1)
Richmond (1)
Sevenoaks (1)
Sidcup (1)
Thanet Wanderers (1)
Tonbridge Juddians (1)
Westcombe Park (1)
Winchester (1)
Worthing (1)

Notes

See also
 London & SE Division RFU
 Hampshire RFU
 Kent RFU
 Surrey RFU
 Sussex RFU
 English rugby union system
 Rugby union in England

References

6
2
Recurring sporting events established in 1987
Sports leagues established in 1987